Gabriel Louis Angoulvant (born 1872 in Longjumeau, France – died 1932 in Paris) was a colonial administrator in the second French colonial empire.

He was appointed governor of French Ivory Coast in 1908. He had little prior experience in Africa and believed that the development of Ivory Coast could proceed only after the forceful conquest, or so-called pacification, of the colony. He thus embarked on a vigorous campaign, sending military expeditions into the hinterland to quell resistance. As a result of these expeditions, local rulers were compelled to obey existing antislavery laws, supply porters and food to the French forces, and ensure the protection of French trade and personnel. In return, the French agreed to leave local customs intact and specifically promised not to intervene in the selection of rulers. But the French often disregarded their side of the agreement, deporting or interning rulers regarded as instigators of revolt. They also regrouped villages and established a uniform administration throughout most of the colony. Finally, they replaced the coutume with an allowance based on performance.

He was elected to the French parliament, representing the territories of French India in 1920.

He contributed to the organization of the Paris Colonial Exposition of 1931.

Angoulvant published a number of books regarding the French colonial empire, including "La Pacification de la Côte d'Ivoire" in 1916.

Titles

Further reading

  Marcel Amondji, "Le rêve du gouverneur Angoulvant", in Félix Houphouët et la Côte d'Ivoire : l'envers d'une légende, Karthala, Paris (1884)
  Ernest Moutoussamy, Les députés de l'Inde française à l'Assemblée nationale sous la IVe République, L'Harmattan, Paris, Budapest, Turin (2003)
  Marcel Souzy, Les coloniaux français illustrés, B. Arnaud, editor, Paris (1940).

See also
 Colonial heads of Côte d'Ivoire
 Colonial heads of French Equatorial Africa
 Colonial heads of Djibouti (French Somaliland)
 List of colonial governors in 1900

References

French colonial governors and administrators
People of the French Third Republic
1872 births
1932 deaths
Colonial heads of Ivory Coast
Colonial Governors of French Sénégal
Colonial Governors of French Somaliland
Governors of French Equatorial Africa
Governors of French India
Honorary Companions of the Order of St Michael and St George
People of French West Africa
1900s in French West Africa
1910s in French West Africa
20th-century French politicians